The canton of Le Sud-Minervois is an administrative division of the Aude department, southern France. It was created at the French canton reorganisation which came into effect in March 2015. Its seat is in Sallèles-d'Aude.

It consists of the following communes:
 
Argeliers
Bize-Minervois
Canet
Ginestas
Mailhac
Marcorignan
Mirepeisset
Moussan
Ouveillan
Paraza
Pouzols-Minervois
Raissac-d'Aude
Roubia
Sainte-Valière
Saint-Marcel-sur-Aude
Saint-Nazaire-d'Aude
Sallèles-d'Aude
Ventenac-en-Minervois

References

Cantons of Aude